MTV Unplugged is a live EP by American neo soul singer Maxwell, released by Columbia Records in mid-1997. The album features recordings of Maxwell's performance on the MTV concert series program MTV Unplugged, filmed in New York City earlier in the year. The album includes covers of songs such as Kate Bush's "This Woman's Work" and Nine Inch Nails "Closer."

The singer was asked to do MTV Unplugged, despite only having released only one album, Maxwell's Urban Hang Suite. Maxwell's episode of MTV Unplugged first aired on the network on July 22, 1997".

The live version of "Whenever Wherever Whatever" was nominated for the Grammy Award for Best Male Pop Vocal Performance at the 40th Grammy Awards, but it lost to "Candle in the Wind 1997" by Elton John.

Background
Despite only having released only one album, the music video television channel MTV saw his burgeoning popularity and asked him to tape an episode of the concert series MTV Unplugged in New York City. The show was taped live on June 15, 1997, and he performed his own songs as well as covers of songs by Kate Bush ("This Woman's Work") and Nine Inch Nails ("Closer"). (Unfortunately he clashed with his label about the release of a full album of his session, resulting in the release of only an extended play, or EP instead, containing seven songs.) The MTV Unplugged performance of "...Til the Cops Come Knockin" was included as a bonus track on the international release. The episode of MTV Unplugged first aired on the network on July 22, 1997".

Track listing

Charts

Certifications

See also
List of artists featured on MTV Unplugged

References 

Mtv Unplugged (Maxwell EP)
Maxwell (musician) albums
1997 live albums
Live EPs
1997 debut EPs
Columbia Records live albums